Communist Party (Nepeceriști) (PCN) was a Romanian communist party, officially registered 31 July 2006. The term Nepeceriști means people who were not members of the Romanian Communist Party (PCR).

The party president was Gheorghe I. Ungureanu and the secretary was Constantin M. Gălbeoru.

History
The party was founded in March 1996. On 19 April 1996, the Bucharest District Court dismissed Ungureanu's application to register the party, holding that the party's announced intent to establish a "humane State" founded on communist doctrine, implied that the post-1989 Romanian constitutional and legal order was, in the later words of the European Court of Human Rights "inhumane and not based on genuine democracy".

The court's decision was upheld 28 August 1996 by the Bucharest Court of Appeal, but was overturned by the European Court of Human Rights under Article 11 of the European Convention on Human Rights, and the party was registered 31 July 2006. However, in 2008 it was dissolved again by the authorities, although in the official "Political Parties Register" was still listed as active, since the party appealed the verdict and won the case.

It was dissolved in 2014.

Notes

1996 establishments in Romania
2014 disestablishments in Romania
Article 11 of the European Convention on Human Rights
Banned communist parties
Communist parties in Romania
Defunct communist parties
Defunct socialist parties in Romania
European Court of Human Rights cases involving Romania
Political parties disestablished in 2014
Political parties established in 1996